Profundisepta is a genus of sea snails, marine gastropod mollusks in the family Fissurellidae, the keyhole limpets.

Species
Species within the genus Profundisepta include:
 Profundisepta alicei (Dautzenberg & Fischer, 1897)
 Profundisepta borroi (Pérez Farfante, 1947)
 Profundisepta circularis (Dall, 1881)
 Profundisepta denudata Simone & Cunha, 2014 
 Profundisepta gemmata (Schepman, 1908)
 Profundisepta profundi (Jeffreys, 1877)
 Profundisepta sportella (Watson, 1883)
 Profundisepta voraginosa (Herbert & Kilburn, 1986)

References

 Spencer, H.; Marshall. B. (2009). All Mollusca except Opisthobranchia. In: Gordon, D. (Ed.) (2009). New Zealand Inventory of Biodiversity. Volume One: Kingdom Animalia. 584 pp
 McLean J.H. & Geiger D.L. (1998). New genera and species having the Fissurisepta shell form, with a generic-level phylogenetic analysis (Gastropoda: Fissurellidae). Contributions in Science, Natural History Museum of Los Angeles County 475: 1-32

External links
  McLean J.H. & Geiger D.L. 1998. New genera and species having the Fissurisepta shell form, with a generic level phylogenetic analysis (Gastropoda: Fissurellidae). Contributions in Science, Natural History Museum of Los Angeles County, 475: 1-32

Fissurellidae